Joe Beasman Hall (November 30, 1928 – January 15, 2022) was an American college basketball coach. He was the head coach at the University of Kentucky from 1972 to 1985, leading the Wildcats to a national championship in 1978.

Biography
Hall played one year of varsity basketball at Kentucky before transferring to the Sewanee: The University of the South, where he completed his basketball playing eligibility but did not graduate.  After Sewanee, Hall toured with the Harlem Globetrotters and later returned to Kentucky to complete his undergraduate studies.  Hall graduated from Kentucky in 1955.

Hall previously coached at the Central Missouri State College (now the University of Central Missouri) and Regis University before returning to Kentucky in 1965 to serve as an assistant coach under Adolph Rupp. When Rupp reached mandatory retirement age of 70, Hall was selected as the new coach on April 1, 1972. In his initial statements upon taking the job he made it clear that he would recruit black players to the team (previously there had only been three in the program's history).

In the 1978 NCAA tournament, he coached the Wildcats to their fifth NCAA Men's Division I Basketball Championship. He was named National Coach of the Year in 1978 and Southeastern Conference Coach of the Year on four occasions. His record at UK was 297–100, and 373–156 over his career. Along with the 1978 title, Hall also guided Kentucky to a runner-up finish to UCLA in the 1975 NCAA tournament, a Final Four appearance in the 1984 NCAA tournament (losing to eventual champion Georgetown), and an NIT championship in 1976. He won eight Southeastern Conference regular season championships and one Southeastern Conference tournament championship.

On September 18, 2012, the University of Kentucky unveiled a statue of Hall outside of the Wildcat Coal Lodge to commemorate his accomplishments at UK and his contributions toward the Wildcat Coal Lodge. The university said that the bronze sculpture was produced over a period of eight months, beginning as a clay sculpture, then was cast in bronze. It was created by sculptor J. Brett Grill of Columbia, Missouri. Hall co-hosted a radio sports talk show with former University of Louisville basketball head coach Denny Crum from March 2004 to October 2014. The Joe B. and Denny Show ended on October 30, 2014, after WVLK-FM, the Lexington station from which Hall did his portion of the show, announced a change in format.

Personal life and death
Hall died at his residence in Lexington, Kentucky, on January 15, 2022, at the age of 93. He was buried at The Lexington Cemetery in Lexington, Kentucky.

Head coaching record

See also
 List of NCAA Division I Men's Final Four appearances by coach

References

External links
 University of Kentucky Coaching Record at BigBlueHistory.net

1928 births
2022 deaths
American men's basketball coaches
Basketball coaches from Kentucky
Basketball players from Lexington, Kentucky
Central Missouri Mules basketball coaches
College men's basketball head coaches in the United States
High school basketball coaches in the United States
Kentucky Wildcats men's basketball coaches
Kentucky Wildcats men's basketball players
People from Cynthiana, Kentucky
Regis Rangers men's basketball coaches
Sewanee Tigers men's basketball players